Orculella exaggerata is a species of air-breathing land snail, a terrestrial pulmonate gastropod mollusc in the family Orculidae.

Geographic distribution
O. exaggerata is endemic to Greece, where it occurs on the islands of Kasos, Karpathos and Saria in the south Aegean Sea.

See also
List of non-marine molluscs of Greece

References 

Orculidae
Molluscs of Europe
Endemic fauna of Greece
Gastropods described in 1936